Lechang (historically Lokchong) is a county-level city in the northern Guangdong province, People's Republic of China, bordering Hunan province to the north. It is under the administration of Shaoguan prefecture-level city.

History
In the year 508, south cantilever beam of Qujiang County, the county set 598 years (Sui Kai Huang eighteen years) renamed Lechang County, Guangdong Province, to submit "on the Lechang County, county to city to consult on August 30, 1993 "1994 official county to city. It is a historic city.

2014, Lechang municipal bodies of nine people including members of Lechang party secretary Li, Mo Janus Lechang COMMITTEE Discipline Committee is being investigated for accepting red envelopes.

Administrative division
 Lecheng Subdistrict (Lechang's main urban area)
 Pingshi Town
 Meihua Town
 Changlai Town
 Shaping Town
 Qingyun Town
 (the list is incomplete)

Climate

References

County-level cities in Guangdong
Shaoguan